Raulian Paiva Frazão (born 17 October 1995) is a Brazilian mixed martial artist who competed in the Bantamweight division of the Ultimate Fighting Championship.

Background 
Paiva was born and raised Santana, Amapá, Brazil where he still trains. He started his MMA career at the age of 18. Paiva attended college majoring in IT, but dropped out to pursue a career in mixed martial arts.

Mixed martial arts career

Dana White Contender Series 
Paiva appeared on the program Dana White's Contender Series Brazil. He faced Allan Nascimento on August 11, 2018 and won the fight via split decision. With the win, Paiva was offered a UFC contract.

Ultimate Fighting Championship 
Paiva made his UFC debut on February 10, 2019 at UFC 234 where he faced New Zealand fighter Kai Kara-France.  He lost the fight on a split decision.

His next fight was on August 10, 2019 at UFC Fight Night: Shevchenko vs. Carmouche 2 against Rogério Bontorin. He lost the fight via technical knockout after receiving a deep gash on his eyebrow.

Paiva faced Mark De La Rosa on February 15, 2020 at UFC Fight Night 167. He won the fight via knockout in the second round.

Paiva faced Zhalgas Zhumagulov on July 11, 2020 at UFC 251. At the weigh ins, Paiva weighed in at 129 pounds, 3 pounds over the flyweight non-title limit. He was fined 20% of his purse. The bout proceeded at catchweight. He won the fight via unanimous decision.

Paiva was expected to face Amir Albazi on October 31, 2020 at UFC Fight Night: Hall vs. Silva.  However, Paiva pulled out of the fight on 11 September citing a knee injury.

Paiva was scheduled to face David Dvořák on May 22, 2021 at UFC Fight Night: Font vs. Garbrandt. However, Paiva pulled out of the fight on the day before the event due to ill effects related to his weight cut. As a result, the bout was scrapped.

Paiva faced Kyler Phillips on July 24, 2021 at UFC on ESPN: Sandhagen vs. Dillashaw. Paiva won the fight via majority decision despite 14 of 16 media members scoring the bout a draw. This fight earned him the Fight of the Night award.

Paiva faced Sean O'Malley on December 11, 2021 at UFC 269. He lost the fight via first round TKO.

Paiva faced Sergey Morozov on June 25, 2022, at UFC on ESPN 38. He lost the fight via unanimous decision.

It was annonced in mid January that Paiva was released by UFC.

Personal life
On 21 October 2018 Paiva and his girlfriend Tieli Alves were leaving a party in their hometown on motorcycle when they were intentionally struck by a car driven by individuals they had gotten into an argument with at the event. Paiva did not suffer any serious injuries but his girlfriend Alves suffered serious head trauma and remained in a coma for six days before dying. The alleged occupants of the car, Elber Nunes Zacheu and Johny de Souza Amoras, were later arrested by police,  Zacheu was handed the sentence for 16 years both for the death of Tieli Alves, and for attempting to kill Paiva and the driver, de Souza Amoras, had been a fugitive, but was arrested a day prior to Zacheu’s trial commencing where his trial is expected to commence in 2023. In remembrance of his late girlfriend Paiva has had her name written on his mouthguard during his UFC fights.

Championships and achievements

Mixed martial arts
 Ultimate Fighting Championship
Fight of the Night (One time) 
 North Extreme Championship
NEC Bantamweight Championship (one time; former)

Mixed martial arts record 

|-
|Loss
|align=center|21–5
|Sergey Morozov
|Decision (unanimous)
|UFC on ESPN: Tsarukyan vs. Gamrot
|
|align=center|3
|align=center|5:00
|Las Vegas, Nevada, United States
|
|-
|Loss
|align=center|21–4
|Sean O'Malley 
|TKO (punches)
|UFC 269
|
|align=center|1
|align=center|4:42
|Las Vegas, Nevada, United States
|
|-
|Win
|align=center|21–3
|Kyler Phillips
|Decision (majority)
|UFC on ESPN: Sandhagen vs. Dillashaw 
|
|align=center|3
|align=center|5:00
|Las Vegas, Nevada, United States
|
|-
|Win
|align=center|20–3
|Zhalgas Zhumagulov
|Decision (unanimous)
|UFC 251 
|
|align=center|3
|align=center|5:00
|Abu Dhabi, United Arab Emirates
|
|-
|Win
|align=center|19–3
|Mark De La Rosa
|KO (punches)
|UFC Fight Night: Anderson vs. Błachowicz 2 
|
|align=center|2
|align=center|4:42
|Rio Rancho, New Mexico, United States
|
|-
|Loss
|align=center|18–3
|Rogério Bontorin
|TKO (doctor stoppage)
|UFC Fight Night: Shevchenko vs. Carmouche 2
|
|align=center|1
|align=center|2:56
|Montevideo, Uruguay
|
|-
|Loss
|align=center|18–2
|Kai Kara-France
|Decision (split)
|UFC 234
|
|align=center|3
|align=center|5:00
|Melbourne, Australia
|
|-
|Win
|align=center|18–1
|Allan Nascimento
|Decision (split)
|Dana White's Contender Series Brazil 3
|
|align=center|3
|align=center|5:00
|Las Vegas, Nevada, United States
|
|-
|Win
|align=center|17–1
|Iliarde Santos
|KO (punches)
|Salvaterra Marajo Fight 7
|
|align=center|1
|align=center|0:58
|Salvaterra, Brazil
|
|-
|Win
|align=center|16–1
|Lisrael Pereira Figueiredo
|Submission (arm-triangle choke)
|Pezão Combate: Raulian vs. Miojo
|
|align=center|1
|align=center|4:29
|Macapá, Brazil
|
|-
|Win
|align=center|15–1
|Renan Carlos dos Santos Silva
|Submission (anaconda choke)
|Eco Fight Championship 18
|
|align=center|2
|align=center|2:08
|Macapá, Brazil
|
|-
|Win
|align=center|14–1
|Jefte Costa Brilhante
|Decision (unanimous)
|W-Combat 21
|
|align=center|3
|align=center|5:00
|Santana, Brazil
|
|-
|Win
|align=center|13–1
|Adriano da Silva Santana
|Decision (split)
|North Extreme Cagefighting 31
|
|align=center|3
|align=center|5:00
|Macapá, Brazil
|
|-
|Win
|align=center|12–1
|Chrysangelo Moraes
|Decision (unanimous)
|North Extreme Cagefighting 27
|
|align=center|3
|align=center|5:00
|Macapá, Brazil
|
|-
|Win
|align=center|11–1
|José Silva da Silva Jr.
|TKO (punches)
|North Extreme Cagefighting 25
|
|align=center|3
|align=center|0:49
|Oiapoque, Brazil
|
|-
|Win
|align=center|10–1
|Rogério Ferreira Furtado
|Decision (unanimous)
|North Extreme Cagefighting 23
|
|align=center|3
|align=center|5:00
|Santana, Brazil
|
|-
|Win
|align=center|9–1
|Klebson Freitas Araújo
|TKO (punches)
|Iron Man Vale Tudo 29
|
|align=center|1
|align=center|1:12
|Macapá, Brazil
|
|-
|Win
|align=center|8–1
|Juvêncio Barbosa Coelho
|Decision (unanimous)
|Expo Fight 16
|
|align=center|3
|align=center|5:00
|Macapá, Brazil
|
|-
|Win
|align=center|7–1
|Jonas dos Santos
|Decision (unanimous)
|Expo Fight 16
|
|align=center|3
|align=center|5:00
|Macapá, Brazil
|
|-
|Loss
|align=center|6–1
|Luan Lacerda
|Submission (anaconda choke)
|Eco Fight Championship 15
|
|align=center|3
|align=center|3:50
|Macapá, Brazil
|
|-
|Win
|align=center|6–0
|Lucas Bessa
|Decision (unanimous)
|North Extreme Cagefighting 17
|
|align=center|3
|align=center|5:00
|Santana, Brazil
|
|-
|Win
|align=center|5–0
|Junior de Souza Valente
|Submission (kimura)
|Gladiadores MMA 4: Simão vs. Roberto
|
|align=center|2
|align=center|1:46
|Macapá, Brazil
|
|-
|Win
|align=center|4–0
|Aluizio Bruno Silva dos Santos
|Decision (unanimous)
|W-Combat 20
|
|align=center|3
|align=center|5:00
|Macapá, Brazil
|
|-
|Win
|align=center|3–0
|Edflávio da Silva Freitas
|Decision (unanimous)
|North Extreme Cagefighting 14
|
|align=center|3
|align=center|5:00
|Macapá, Brazil
|
|-
|Win
|align=center|2–0
|Werllen Furtado dos Santos
|Decision (unanimous)
|W-Combat 19
|
|align=center|3
|align=center|5:00
|Macapá, Brazil
|
|-
|Win
|align=center|1–0
|Moisés Santos
|Decision (unanimous)
|ExpoFight Amapá
|
|align=center|3
|align=center|5:00
|Macapá, Brazil
|
|-

See also 
 List of male mixed martial artists

References

External links
 
 

1995 births
Living people
Brazilian male mixed martial artists
Flyweight mixed martial artists
Mixed martial artists utilizing Brazilian jiu-jitsu
Ultimate Fighting Championship male fighters
Brazilian practitioners of Brazilian jiu-jitsu
People awarded a black belt in Brazilian jiu-jitsu
Sportspeople from Amapá